Erol Azgın (born 13 March 1963) is a retired Turkish football midfielder and later manager.

References

1963 births
Living people
Turkish footballers
Gaziantepspor footballers
Çaykur Rizespor footballers
Adana Demirspor footballers
Siirtspor footballers
Adıyamanspor footballers
Gaziantep F.K. footballers
Turkish football managers
Göztepe S.K. managers
Association footballers not categorized by position